HDGF may refer to:

 Hepatoma-derived growth factor, a human gene
 Horrible DiaGram Format, an implementation of Microsoft Visio binary files in the Apache POI project